Hare Krsna Content Broadcast Pvt. Ltd (HKCBPL), is an international media network and TV channel. The media network broadcasts non-denominational, cultural programmes offered by ISKCON and other Spiritual Organizations.

History 
Hare Krsna TV has been accepted as National Television Channel by leaders of ISKCON, was founded by A. C. Bhaktivedanta Swami Prabhupada. The channel launched on Janmashtami 2016, on the eve of the 50th anniversary of ISKCON for celebrating the various cultural elements of planet earth.

Programming 
Hare Krsna TV Free to Air Channel features content from across 600 ISKCON centers globally and displays events, music, kirtans, yatras, lectures, bhajans, talks, documentaries, food shows, entertaining stories, children's shows, lifestyle content, Geeta discourses, Vedic analysis, and so forth.

Notable hosts and speakers

Srila Prabhupada
Jayapataka Swami
Radhanath Swami
Sivarama Swami
Indradyumna Swami
Bhakti Charu Swami
Kadamba Kanana Swami
Gaur Gopal Prabhu

References

External links 
 
 

Television stations in Mumbai
2016 establishments in Maharashtra
Television channels and stations established in 2016
Hindu television
International Society for Krishna Consciousness media